Dadar railway station  is one of the major interchange railway stations of Mumbai Suburban Railway. It serves the Dadar area in Mumbai, India.

This railway station lies on both the Central line named as Dadar Central with station code DR and  Western line named as Dadar Western with station code DDR. It's also a terminal for Mumbai Suburban Railway as well as Indian Railways.

Two roads are passes through parallel in the vicinity of Dadar railway station which is Senapati Bapat Marg on the Westside and Lakhamsi Nappu Road on the Eastside.

Structure
Dadar railway station has 15 platforms, In that, 7 platforms consist of the Western side which is two platforms of the slow suburban route, three platforms of the fast suburban route and the last two platforms are the terminus of the Suburban and Long Distance trains which are also known as Dadar Midtown Terminus.

The remaining 8 platforms consist of the Central line, which is of three platforms on the slow suburban route with middle-slow suburban terminal, three platforms are on the fast suburban route with middle-fast suburban terminal, and the last two platforms are the terminus of long-distance trains which is also known as Dadar Central Terminus or Dadar Terminus.

This railway station is well connected with multiple walkways and bridges for easier access of passengers crossing on both sides.

And also there are multiple Escalators available on both the sides for help in interchanging stations, which were Inaugurated on 1 November 2013 on the Western line side by Western Railway And the remaining escalators were inaugurated on 21 January 2018 on the Central line side by Central Railway.

Passengers
Dadar is the busiest railway station on the Mumbai Suburban Railway network with an average of 211,888 passengers begins their journey from this station per day contributing  of average daily revenue.

In October 2012, CR announced plans to cease long-distance train services terminating at Dadar on the Central side within 5–6 years. The load would be transferred to Lokmanya Tilak Terminus (LTT) by upgrading the number of platforms at LTT from five to 12.

Operations
Dadar railway station handles a total of 88 long-distance trains. In which 12 trains are on the Western line side in which 3 long-distance trains originate and terminate at Midtown Terminus and 9 long-distance trains halt at the fast suburban route of Western line.

Whereas, 76 trains are on the Central line side in which 11 long-distance trains originate and terminate at Central Terminus and 65 long-distance trains halt at the fast suburban route of Central line.

History
Dadar railway station was inaugurated in the year 1868 for direct connectivity on both sides of Central Railway and Western Railway network. After that the Central Terminus on Central line side was constructed and opened on 1968.

During the Indo-Pakistan War of 1971 a Jawan Canteen was established in the station to serve Indian soldiers. The Canteen was conducted by Wadala Junior Chambers (Founder- Gangaram Joshi), under the guidance of Nanik Rupani, who was the President at that time.

After decades, In 2009 The Midtown terminus of Dadar Western side was inaugurated for increasing more trains on the suburban route and long-distance route for decreasing a load of passengers. And the side elevated road which is parallel to Midtown Terminus connects to Tilak Bridge for direct taxi's and another vehicle's movement, was inaugurated in 2014.

References

External links
 Dadar Central at India Rail Info
 Dadar Western at India Rail Info

Mumbai CR railway division
Railway stations in Mumbai City district
Mumbai Suburban Railway stations
Mumbai WR railway division
Railway stations opened in 1868
1868 establishments in India
Indian Railway A1 Category Stations